The women's feather weight (57 kilograms) event at the 2018 Asian Games took place from 24 August to 1 September  2018 at Jakarta International Expo Hall, Jakarta, Indonesia.

Like all Asian Games boxing events, the competition was a straight single-elimination tournament. Yin Junhua of China won the gold medal. She beat Jo Son-hwa from North Korea in the final bout 4–1. Huang Hsiao-wen from Chinese Taipei and Nilawan Techasuep of Thailand shared the bronze medal.

Schedule
All times are Western Indonesia Time (UTC+07:00)

Results 
Legend
WO — Won by walkover

References

External links
Official website

Boxing at the 2018 Asian Games